The Mayor of Messina is an elected politician who, along with the Messina's City Council, is accountable for the strategic government of Messina in Sicily, Italy.

Overview
According to the Italian Constitution, the Mayor of Messina is member of the City Council.

The Mayor is elected by the population of Messina, who also elects the members of the City Council, controlling the Mayor's policy guidelines and is able to enforce his resignation by a motion of no confidence. The Mayor is entitled to appoint and release the members of his government.

Since 1994 the Mayor is elected directly by Messina's electorate: in all mayoral elections in Italy in cities with a population higher than 15,000 the voters express a direct choice for the mayor or an indirect choice voting for the party of the candidate's coalition. If no candidate receives at least 50% of votes, the top two candidates go to a second round after two weeks. The election of the City Council is based on a direct choice for the candidate with a preference vote: the candidate with the majority of the preferences is elected. The number of the seats for each party is determined proportionally.

Italian Republic (since 1946)

City Council election (1947-1994)

From 1947 to 1994, the Mayor of Messina was elected by the City's Council.

Direct election (since 1994)
Since 1994, under provisions of new local administration law, the Mayor of Messina is chosen by direct election, originally every four, then every five years.

Notes

See also
Timeline of Messina
Politics of Sicily

References

External links
 

Messina
 
Politics of Sicily
Messina